Marius Ştefoi (born 23 April 1990) is a Romanian footballer, who plays for SC NicMar-Danci.

Career 
The right midfielder played 26 matches for FC Botoșani and 3 matches for FC Vaslui in the Liga I.

International 
Ștefoi was from 2008 to 2009 member of the Romania national under-19 football team and played his debut on 15 December 2008 against Italy national under-19 football team.

References

Romanian footballers
1990 births
Living people
FC Vaslui players
FC Botoșani players
FC Zalău players
Liga I players
Association football midfielders